Máscara Mágica may refer to the following wrestlers:
 Eddie Guerrero (1992)
 Antonio Gómez Medina (1993-on)